Gains Whiting (1865–1946) was a New Zealand trade unionist and political activist.

Political activity

Born in Christchurch, New Zealand, Whiting was Secretary of the New Zealand Boot Trade Federation. He later became President of the Canterbury Trades and Labour Council and Chairman of the Christchurch LRC.

Gains Whiting was the NZLP candidate for Christchurch South in 1911. A strong ally of Tom Paul he tried to keep the United Labour Party (ULP) active in Christchurch after the formation of the Social Democratic Party in 1913. Whiting stood as an Independent Labour-ULP candidate for Christchurch South at the 1914 general election.

He died in 1946.

Further reading

Labour's Path to Political Independence: the Origins and Establishment of the NZLP 1900-19 by Barry Gustafson (1980, Oxford University Press, Auckland)

1865 births
1946 deaths
New Zealand trade unionists
People from Christchurch
New Zealand Labour Party politicians
United Labour Party (New Zealand) politicians
New Zealand Labour Party (1910) politicians
Unsuccessful candidates in the 1911 New Zealand general election
Unsuccessful candidates in the 1914 New Zealand general election